Monte Bove is a mountain in the Monti Sibillini range of the Apennines, Marche, central Italy.

Monte Bove may also refer to:

 Monte Bove (Chile), a mountain of the Cordillera Darwin, Chile
 Monte Bove Sud, a mountain of Marche, Italy
 Croce di Monte Bove, a mountain of Marche, Italy

See also
 Bove (disambiguation)